Creighton Leland Robertson (March 6, 1944 - October 24, 2014) was ninth bishop of the Episcopal Diocese of South Dakota from 1994 to 2009.

Early life and education
Robertson was born in Kansas City, Missouri and was a member of the Sisseton Wahpeton Oyate. Then Robertson and his family moved to the Lake Traverse Indian Reservation and eventually to Wahpeton, North Dakota where Robertson graduated from high school. He graduated from the North Dakota State College of Science with an associate degree in printing in 1964, followed by a bachelor's degree in history from Black Hills State University in 1971. He went to the University of South Dakota School of Law and graduated in 1976.

Career
Robertson practiced law in Webster, South Dakota. He was the attorney for the Sisseton Wapheton Oyate and a tribal judge. He worked for the South Dakota Department of Labor and served on the South Dakota Human Rights Commission. In 1986, Robertson studied for the Episcopalian ministry at the University of the South and graduated with an M.Div. in 1989.

Robertson was ordained to the diaconate on June 22, 1989, and to the priesthood on May 6, 1990. He was consecrated as a bishop on June 19, 1994, by Edmond L. Browning, Harold S. Jones, and Craig Anderson.

References

External links 
Diocese of South Dakota website

1944 births
2014 deaths
People from Webster, South Dakota
Lawyers from Kansas City, Missouri
North Dakota State College of Science alumni
Black Hills State University alumni
Sewanee: The University of the South alumni
University of South Dakota School of Law alumni
South Dakota lawyers
21st-century Anglican bishops in the United States
20th-century Anglican bishops in the United States
Native American Episcopalians
Sisseton Wahpeton Oyate people
20th-century American lawyers
Episcopal bishops of South Dakota